Carmenta pallene is a moth of the family Sesiidae. It was described by Herbert Druce in 1889. It was described from Tabasco in Mexico, but it is also known from Arizona in the United States.

References

External links

Sesiidae
Moths described in 1889